The arrondissement of Brive-la-Gaillarde is an arrondissement of France in the Corrèze departement in the Nouvelle-Aquitaine region. It has 96 communes.

Composition

The communes of the arrondissement of Brive-la-Gaillarde, and their INSEE codes, are:

 Albignac (19003)
 Allassac (19005)
 Altillac (19007)
 Arnac-Pompadour (19011)
 Astaillac (19012)
 Aubazines (19013)
 Ayen (19015)
 Beaulieu-sur-Dordogne (19019)
 Benayes (19022)
 Beynat (19023)
 Beyssac (19024)
 Beyssenac (19025)
 Bilhac (19026)
 Branceilles (19029)
 Brignac-la-Plaine (19030)
 Brive-la-Gaillarde (19031)
 Chabrignac (19035)
 La Chapelle-aux-Brocs (19043)
 La Chapelle-aux-Saints (19044)
 Chartrier-Ferrière (19047)
 Chasteaux (19049)
 Chauffour-sur-Vell (19050)
 Chenailler-Mascheix (19054)
 Collonges-la-Rouge (19057)
 Concèze (19059)
 Cosnac (19063)
 Cublac (19066)
 Curemonte (19067)
 Dampniat (19068)
 Donzenac (19072)
 Estivals (19077)
 Estivaux (19078)
 Jugeals-Nazareth (19093)
 Juillac (19094)
 Lagleygeolle (19099)
 Lanteuil (19105)
 Larche (19107)
 Lascaux (19109)
 Ligneyrac (19115)
 Liourdres (19116)
 Lissac-sur-Couze (19117)
 Lostanges (19119)
 Louignac (19120)
 Lubersac (19121)
 Malemort (19123)
 Mansac (19124)
 Marcillac-la-Croze (19126)
 Ménoire (19132)
 Meyssac (19138)
 Montgibaud (19144)
 Nespouls (19147)
 Noailhac (19150)
 Noailles (19151)
 Nonards (19152)
 Objat (19153)
 Palazinges (19156)
 Perpezac-le-Blanc (19161)
 Le Pescher (19163)
 Puy-d'Arnac (19169)
 Queyssac-les-Vignes (19170)
 Rosiers-de-Juillac (19177)
 Sadroc (19178)
 Saillac (19179)
 Saint-Aulaire (19182)
 Saint-Bazile-de-Meyssac (19184)
 Saint-Bonnet-la-Rivière (19187)
 Saint-Bonnet-l'Enfantier (19188)
 Saint-Cernin-de-Larche (19191)
 Saint-Cyprien (19195)
 Saint-Cyr-la-Roche (19196)
 Sainte-Féréole (19202)
 Saint-Éloy-les-Tuileries (19198)
 Saint-Julien-le-Vendômois (19216)
 Saint-Julien-Maumont (19217)
 Saint-Martin-Sepert (19223)
 Saint-Pantaléon-de-Larche (19229)
 Saint-Pardoux-Corbier (19230)
 Saint-Pardoux-l'Ortigier (19234)
 Saint-Robert (19239)
 Saint-Solve (19242)
 Saint-Sornin-Lavolps (19243)
 Saint-Viance (19246)
 Segonzac (19253)
 Ségur-le-Château (19254)
 Sérilhac (19257)
 Sioniac (19260)
 Troche (19270)
 Tudeils (19271)
 Turenne (19273)
 Ussac (19274)
 Varetz (19278)
 Vars-sur-Roseix (19279)
 Végennes (19280)
 Vignols (19286)
 Voutezac (19288)
 Yssandon (19289)

History

The arrondissement of Brive-la-Gaillarde was created in 1800. At the January 2017 reorganisation of the arrondissements of Corrèze, it gained two communes from the arrondissement of Tulle, and it lost three communes to the arrondissement of Tulle.

As a result of the reorganisation of the cantons of France which came into effect in 2015, the borders of the cantons are no longer related to the borders of the arrondissements. The cantons of the arrondissement of Brive-la-Gaillarde were, as of January 2015:

 Ayen
 Beaulieu-sur-Dordogne
 Beynat
 Brive-la-Gaillarde-Centre
 Brive-la-Gaillarde-Nord-Est
 Brive-la-Gaillarde-Nord-Ouest
 Brive-la-Gaillarde-Sud-Est
 Brive-la-Gaillarde-Sud-Ouest
 Donzenac
 Juillac
 Larche
 Lubersac
 Malemort-sur-Corrèze
 Meyssac
 Vigeois

References

Brive-la-Gaillarde